Turkesterone is a phytoecdysteroid  found in numerous plant species, including Ajuga turkestanica, various Vitex species, Triticum aestivum, and Rhaponticum acaule. Laboratory studies in rodents have not identified anabolic effects.

See also 
 Ecdysterone

References 

Tertiary alcohols